Florian Busch (born January 2, 1985 in Tegernsee, West Germany) is a German former professional ice hockey forward who last played for Eisbären Berlin of the Deutsche Eishockey Liga (DEL).

Career statistics

Regular season and playoffs

International

References

External links
 

1985 births
Living people
Eisbären Berlin players
German ice hockey left wingers
Ice hockey players at the 2006 Winter Olympics
Olympic ice hockey players of Germany
People from Miesbach (district)
Sportspeople from Upper Bavaria